Episodes of a Hustla is the debut album by American rapper Big Noyd, released on December 10, 1996, by Tommy Boy Records. He recorded the album after making his name as a rapper on Mobb Deep's The Infamous and Hell on Earth albums. Most of the album was produced by Mobb Deep's Havoc and features guest appearances by Prodigy. Big Noyd's lyrics use violent, disturbing imagery to boast his rapping skills. Episodes of a Hustla charted at number 59 on the Top R&B/Hip-Hop Albums. The album is now out of print.

Track listing
 "It's on You" (prod. by Charlemange)
 "The Precinct" (Interlude)
 "Recognize & Realize (Part 1)" (feat. Prodigy) (prod. by Havoc)
 "All Pro" (feat. Infamous Mobb and Mobb Deep) (prod. by Havoc)
 "Infamous Mobb" (feat. Prodigy) (prod. by Havoc)
 "Interrogation" (Interlude)
 "Usual Suspect" (feat. Prodigy) (prod. by Havoc)
 "Episodes of a Hustla" (feat. Prodigy) (prod. by Havoc)
 "Recognize & Realize (Part 2)" (feat. Mobb Deep) (prod. by Havoc)
 "I Don't Wanna Love Again" (After Six Entertainment Remix)(feat. Se'Kou)
 "Usual Suspect (Stretch Armstrong Remix)" (feat. Prodigy)

Personnel 
Credits adapted from Allmusic.

 Ben Arrindell – Engineer, Mixing
 Carlos Bess – Engineer, Mixing
 Big Noyd – Primary Artist
 Charlemagne – Producer
 Havoc – Producer
 Isaac Hayes – Composer
 Kejuan Muchita – Composer
 Ty Nitty – Vocals (Background)
 Prodigy – Vocals (Background)
 Mario Rodriguez – Engineer
 Se'kou – Featured Artist
 G. Smith – Composer
 Twin – Vocals (Background)
 Michelle Willems – Art Direction
 Isaac Young – Composer

References

External links 
 

1996 debut albums
Big Noyd albums
Tommy Boy Records albums